Ambia ellipes is a moth in the family Crambidae. It is found in Samoa.

References

Moths described in 1935
Musotiminae
Moths of Oceania